State Route 735 (SR 735) is a short east–west state highway in southeastern Ohio, located just northeast of the county seat of Gallia County, Gallipolis.  The highway runs just under  in length between its western terminus at a partial interchange with U.S. Route 35 (US 35) and its eastern terminus at a signalized T-intersection with SR 7.  The route serves solely as a connector from eastbound US 35 to SR 7, and from SR 7 to westbound US 35. An interchange between these two end routes exists nearby, but only allows access from westbound US 35 to SR 7, and from SR 7 to eastbound US 35. SR 735 is a former alignment of US 35 when it traveled on the Silver Bridge to cross the Ohio River to Point Pleasant, West Virginia.

Route description
The short journey of the four-lane divided SR 735, which exists entirely within Gallia County begins at an expansive partial interchange with the US 35 freeway that begins in Gallipolis Township and crosses into Addison Township.

Although both US 35 and SR 7 through this area are a part of the National Highway System, SR 735 itself is not.

History
SR 735 is a former alignment of US 35, constructed in 1967 as part of US 35's Gallipolis bypass.  The original eastern end of the bypass at SR 7 was originally a four-leg intersection, with the fourth leg being formed by the Silver Bridge over the Ohio River to Point Pleasant, West Virginia.

The Silver Bridge collapsed on December 15, 1967 as the result of previously unknown metal fatigue. 46 people died in the collapse. A new section of freeway was built to connect the new bridge to the Gallipolis bypass, leaving behind  of recently built divided highway. This highway became SR 735 in 1969; the route has not experienced any changes since its designation.

Major intersections

References

External links

735
Transportation in Gallia County, Ohio
U.S. Route 35